The UEFA European Under-18 Championship 1995 Final Tournament was held in Greece.

Teams

The following teams qualified for the tournament:

  (host)

Group stage

Group A

Group B

Third place match

Final

See also
 1995 UEFA European Under-18 Championship qualifying

External links
Results by RSSSF

UEFA European Under-19 Championship
1995
Under-18
UEFA European Under-18 Championship
UEFA European Under-18 Championship
UEFA European Under-18 Championship